Charles Grayson could refer to: 

Charles Grayson (writer) (1903-1973), American screenwriter and novelist
Charles E. Grayson (1910-2009), American radiologist and archer
Charles F. Grayson, alias of Moody Merrill (1836–1903), American politician, businessman, and fugitive
Trey Grayson (Charles Merwin Grayson III) (born 1972), American politician